The Rue Belliard (French) or Belliardstraat (Dutch) is a major street in Brussels, Belgium, running parallel to the Rue de la Loi/Wetstraat. Both are one-way streets; where traffic in the Rue de la Loi runs in the western direction towards Brussels' city centre, the Rue Belliard runs in the eastern direction, away from the city centre.

The street runs from the east of the Small Ring (Brussels' inner ring road) to the south-western corner of the Parc du Cinquantenaire/Jubelpark. The section on one lane from one park to the other is partly in the territory of the municipality of Etterbeek. The rest of the street is in the territory of the City of Brussels.

The Rue Belliard is named after Augustin Daniel Belliard, a French general who was governor of the department of the Dyle.

Buildings
The first part of the Rue Belliard (from the / until the /) was opened in 1855, while the second part of the street (until the Cinquantenaire) was finished in 1869.

 No. 7: European Commission
 No. 15–17: Embassy of Bosnia and Herzegovina
 No. 25–33: 
 No. 28: European Commission
 No. 40: Odas Global Consulting Ltd.
 No. 41–43: Permanent Representation of Lithuania to the European Union
 No. 58: Goethe-Institut
 No. 60–62: Permanent Representation of German State Baden-Württemberg to the European Union
 No. 65: Red Cross European Union Office
 No. 99–101: Delors building, home of the European Economic and Social Committee and Committee of the Regions
 No. 100: European Commission
 No. 135: House of European History (HEH) in Leopold Park
 No. 137: Former Solvay Library in Leopold Park
 No. 199: Greenpeace European Union Office

See also
 List of streets in Brussels
 Brussels and the European Union
 History of Brussels
 Belgium in "the long nineteenth century"

References

Notes

External links

 European Economic and Social Committee
 Committee of the Regions
 European Parliament
 European Commission
 Odas Global Consulting
 Pictures of Rue Belliard

Belliard
City of Brussels
European quarter of Brussels